Scartezzini is an Italian surname. Notable people with the surname include:
Jean-Louis Scartezzini (born 1957),  Swiss building physicist
Mariano Scartezzini (born 1954), Italian long-distance runner
Michele Scartezzini (born 1992), Italian cyclist

Italian-language surnames